Saint Claudius may refer to:
 Claudius of Besançon (Saint Claude) (d. 699 AD), bishop and abbot
 Saint Claudius, one of the Four Crowned Martyrs
 Saint Claudius, martyr of León, Spain, one of the sons of Saint Marcellus of Tangier
 Saints Claudius and Hilaria, two martyrs who were converted by Saints Chrysanthus and Daria

See also
 St. Claude de la Colombière